Manuel Augusta Trías Parada (born 18 December 1997) is a Venezuelan footballer who plays as a defender for Aragua F.C. in the Venezuelan Primera División.

Career

Aragua
A graduate of the club's youth academy, Trías made his competitive debut for the club on 24 March 2016 in a 1-1 draw with Trujillanos. In 2018, he signed a two-year extension with the club. At the end of that contract period, Trías signed a further two-year extension.

Career statistics

Club

References

External links

1997 births
Living people
Aragua FC players
Venezuelan Primera División players
Venezuelan footballers
Association football defenders
Sportspeople from Maracay
21st-century Venezuelan people